''Tarḫuntašša ( dIM-ta-aš-ša "City of Tarhunt"; Hieroglyphic Luwian:  (DEUS)TONITRUS-hu-ta-sá) was a Hittite Bronze Age city in south-central Anatolia mentioned in Hittite documents. Its location is unknown. In 2019, a previously little-researched site at Türkmen-Karahöyük, near Çumra on the Konya Plain, was investigated and put forward as the site of Tarḫuntassa by Michele Massa, James Osborne and Christoph Bachhuber. Previously proposed locations include Konya, Sirkeli Höyük in Cilicia, the Göksu valley, the vicinity of Kayseri, Kilise Tepe (near Mut, formerly known as Maltepe), and Kızıldağ (north of Karaman).

 New Hittite capital 
In the early 13th century BC, Muwatalli II moved the Hittite capital from Hattusa to Tarhuntassa. The reasons for this move remain unclear. Official records postdating Muwatalli II's death state that he moved the capital as the result of an omen. Generally, archaeologists explain the move as a military strategy, in order to be closer to the Syrian region in preparation for battle with Ramses II at Kadesh. However, Itamar Singer has proposed instead that Muwatalli II moved the capital as part of a religious reform, attempting to elevate his personal god, pihassassi, the Storm-God of Lightning to a more powerful position in Hittite religious observance. A third explanation is that at this point in time, Tarhuntassa was more centrally located within the network of overland and sea routes connecting the Hittite empire and beyond, making it an ideal capital for managing trade and communication throughout the territory.

Muwatalli II's son Mursili III later moved the capital back to Hattusa. After Hattusili III deposed Mursili, the new king appointed Muwatalli's son Kurunta as king in Tarhuntassa. The treaty which survives mostly refers to the appointed king as "Ulmi-Tessup", and so some scholars believe that Ulmi-Tessup and Kurunta are two different rulers of Tarhuntassa.

 Kurunta of Tarhuntassa 
Tudhaliya IV re-ratified Kurunta as king in a treaty inscribed in bronze. At this time, Kurunta was leading his forces to war with Parha. This treaty, unlike previous treaties involving Tarhuntassa, calls to witness the Hittites' vassal kings of Mira and the Seha River Land on the Aegean coast. This implies that Tarhuntassa's stature was now a matter of importance for all western Anatolia.

Kurunta later claimed the title of Great King for himself. Whether or not this claim extended to the whole domain of Hatti, the court in Hattusa contested it (and buried the treaty).

 Fall of the Hittite Empire 
Toward the end of the Hittite empire, Suppiluliuma II recorded in a Hieroglyphic Luwian inscription that Hatti had attacked and sacked the city of Tarhuntassa. Other Hieroglyphic Luwian inscriptions from the late 13th century BC also mention a certain great king Hartapu, son of the great king Mursili (III), who likely ruled Tarhuntassa. It may be possible that Suppiluliuma II's campaign was directed against Hartapu.

Türkmen-Karahöyük
Though occupied beginning in the Late Chalcolithic period this site was most heavily occupied in the Late Bronze Age (c. 1300-1100 BC) and Middle Iron Age (c. 900-600 BC). At those times it reached an extent of over 120 hectares making it largest site in west and central Anatolia. During a 2019 regional archaeological survey, called the Konya Regional Archaeological Survey Project, Oriental Institute of Chicago archaeologists unearthed a monumental Luwian Hieroglyphs inscription in an irrigation ditch. Investigation showed that the stone had originally been at the top of the mound but had been moved during illegal excavations. The inscription detailed a ruler named Harapu's victory over Phrygia.

Because an already known inscription referred to a Hartapu son of Mursili which some suggested was Mursili III a known king of Tarḫuntašša some researchers speculated Türkmen-Karahöyük was Tarḫuntašša. The excavators determined that the inscription dated to the 8th century BC, much too recent to be related to Tarḫuntašša and continue to stand by that view though not precluding the site being Tarḫuntašša in Middle Bronze times. At the site of Kızıldağ, about 13 kilometers to the south-southeast, there is another inscription of Hartapu on an outcrop.

References

Sources
 O. R. Gurney (1993), "The Treaty with Ulmi-Tešub", Anatolian Studies 43''':13-28.

Hittite cities
Luwians
Former populated places in Turkey
Late Bronze Age collapse
Lost cities and towns